

The MSW Votec 322 is a Swiss two-seat low-wing monoplane based on the Rihn DR-107 One Design and designed for amateur construction by MSW Aviation of Wohlen.

Design and development
The MSW 322 was designed by Max Vogelsang and derived from the Rihn DR-107 One Design which MSW Aviation had bought. The first prototype, registered HB-YJY first flew on 6 April 2001. The Votec 322 is a low-wing cantilever monoplane with a steel-tube fuselage, wooden wings with a carbon fibre fuselage skin, and a  conventional landing gear with a steerable tailwheel. The aircraft is powered by a  Lycoming AEIO-540 flat-six piston engine driving a three-bladed tractor propeller. Later a four-bladed propeller was installed to reduce noise. The cockpit has room for two in tandem with a one-piece side-hinged canopy.

In 2006 the eighth Votec 322 was converted into the first and, as of October 2011, the only Votec 351, a single seater. This flew for the first time on 23 September 2006. It has the same external dimensions as the Votec 322 but is  lighter when empty and has the more powerful  Lycoming AEIO-580 flat six engine. One consequence is an improvement in the rate of climb of about 0.3%.

The Votec 452T, another Votec 322 variant, first flew on 4 June 2010. It is similar to its predecessor in span and weight but has a  Rolls-Royce M250-B17D turboprop engine and is  longer. The prototype remains the only example in October 2011.

Operational history
In mid 2010 six Votec 322 aircraft appeared on the European civil registers, together with the lone 351 and the 452T.

Variants

Votec 322 Original tandem seat DR 107 One Design derivative.
Votec 351 Single-seat, higher-power version.
Votec 452T Turboprop-powered, tandem-seat version.

Specifications (Votec 322)

References

Notes

Bibliography

2000s Swiss sport aircraft
Homebuilt aircraft
Single-engined tractor aircraft
Low-wing aircraft
Votec 322
Aircraft first flown in 2001